"Saturday in the Park" is a song written by Robert Lamm and recorded by the group Chicago for their 1972 album Chicago V. It was very successful upon release, reaching  on the Billboard Hot 100, and became the band's highest-charting single at the time, helping lift the album to . Billboard ranked it as the No. 76 song for 1972. The single was certified Gold by the RIAA, selling over 1,000,000 units in the U.S. alone.

Background
According to fellow Chicago member Walter Parazaider, Lamm was inspired to write the song during the recording of Chicago III in New York City on Saturday, July 4, 1970:

However, Lamm recalls the story differently, as he told Billboard magazine:

In the studio version of the song, the line "singing Italian songs" is followed by "Eh Cumpari" (the title of a song made famous by Julius La Rosa in 1953), and then Italian-sounding nonsense words, rendered in the printed lyrics as "?". Piano, guitar, and vocal sheet music arrangements have often read "improvised Italian lyrics" in parentheses after this line. However, in a film of Chicago performing "Saturday in the Park" at the Arie Crown Theater in Chicago in 1972, Robert Lamm clearly sings, "Eh Cumpari, ci vo sunari," the first line of "Eh, Cumpari!".

Chart performance

Weekly charts

Year-end charts

Personnel 
Robert Lamm – lead vocals, electric piano
Peter Cetera – lead vocals (chorus), backing vocals, Bass guitar
Terry Kath – rhythm guitar
Lee Loughnane – trumpet
James Pankow – trombone
Walter Parazaider – alto saxophone
Danny Seraphine – drums

See also
A Roller Skating Jam Named "Saturdays"

References

External links
 

1972 singles
Chicago (band) songs
Songs written by Robert Lamm
Song recordings produced by James William Guercio
Columbia Records singles
1972 songs
Songs based on actual events
Songs about New York City
Macaronic songs